Skiing in India is an activity that mostly takes place in the northern states of India, where the Himalayas are situated. Skiing is administered by the Indian Mountaineering Foundation in India. The Himalayas provide an excellent skiing experience owing to their great height which makes for long descents. Heliskiing is also gaining popularity in places like Manali and Gulmarg. However skiing in India suffers from lack of infrastructure. Some of the most popular skiing locations in India are Gulmarg in Jammu and Kashmir, Solang in Himachal Pradesh and Auli in Uttarakhand. The skiing season in India is from January to March.

List of skiing destinations 

Skiing destinations in India are mostly in the Himalayas and are listed here by state (North-West to South-East):

Jammu and Kashmir
Gulmarg, cable car available
Pahalgam

Himachal Pradesh
Manali, heli-skiing offered in Hanuman Tibba, Rohtang Pass, Deo Tibba and Chanderkhani Pass.
Kufri
Narkanda
Solang Valley (Ropeway available)
Chamba
 Shoja
 Triund
 Fagu

Uttarakhand
Auli, ropeway from Joshimath
Munsiyari
Dayara Bugyal, near Uttarkashi
Mundali, in Garhwal district

Sikkim
Lachung
Yumthang

Arunachal Pradesh
Tawang

Skiing in Manali
Though Europeans were skiing on slopes of Manali for years, it was Darjeeling’s Wangdi Sherpa’s small skiing school at Vashisht village which started giving lessons on skiing to local residents. Simultaneously Western Himalayan Mountaineering Institute (WHMI) (now ABVIMAS) started its courses in skiing and mountaineering in 1961. Winter Sports Club of Manali was founded by some local skiing enthusiasts in 1978 which instilled spirit of skiing in other youths of the region. In 1984, Winter Games Federation of India (WGFI) was formed by a group of visionaries and adventure loving individuals. When Solang ski slopes were not developed, competitions were organized at Rohtang pass in summer months.

Achievements
Aanchal Thakur won bronze in the Alpine Ejder 3200 Cup organised by the Federation Internationale de Ski. This was India's first international medal in skiing.

Skiing institute in India 

There are many institutes in India conducting vocational courses in Skiing. Some major institutes are,
Jawahar Institute of Mountaineering and Winter Sports: Basic skiing & Intermediate skiing courses.
Nehru Institute of Mountaineering
Indian Institute of Skiing and Mountaineering

See also
 Yak skiing

References

External links
 Indian Mountaineering Foundation
 Water Skiing in India